Robert Vincent Moore (born October 27, 1965) is a former professional baseball outfielder. He played in 18 games for the Kansas City Royals of Major League Baseball (MLB) during the 1991 Kansas City Royals season. He is currently the batting coach for the Rome Braves.

Moore was named as the batting coach for the A Rome Braves in the Atlanta Braves organization for the 2018 season.

References

External links

1965 births
Living people
African-American baseball coaches
African-American baseball players
Baseball City Royals players
Baseball coaches from Ohio
Baseball players from Cincinnati
Eastern Kentucky Colonels baseball players
Eugene Emeralds players
Kansas City Royals players
Major League Baseball center fielders
Major League Baseball left fielders
Memphis Chicks players
Minor league baseball coaches
Omaha Royals players
Richmond Braves players
Tecolotes de los Dos Laredos players
21st-century African-American people
20th-century African-American sportspeople